Fitzgerald, Alberta may refer to:

Fitzgerald, Alberta, a locality in the Regional Municipality of Wood Buffalo, Alberta
Fitzgerald, Cypress County, Alberta, a locality in Cypress County, Alberta
Fitzgerald, Thebathi 196, Alberta, a locality in Thebathi 196, Alberta